Faculdade de Direito da Universidade Federal de Minas Gerais (UFMG School of Law)  is the university's oldest unit, and even appeared before UFMG. Recognized internationally, it is considered a center of excellence in legal education, professional training with great ability and critical view. The qualification of teachers - most have the title of doctor - and the high level of students ensure the recognition of its progress.

History

The UFMG School of Law was founded in 1892, under the name "Free School of Law", in Ouro Preto, Minas Gerais. In 1898 it was moved to Belo Horizonte.

At first, the Law School occupied a building on Rua Pernambuco (at Savassi neighborhood), then it was moved to Rua da Bahia (at Lourdes neighborhood) and after that, to Praça da República (Republic Square), which today corresponds to the Praça Afonso Arinos (Afonso Arinos Square), where it still remains as of 2009.

In 1958, the old building was demolished, giving place the Villas-Boas building (inaugurated by the Director Antonio Martins Villas-Bôas), the Valle-Ferreira building (inaugurated by the Dean Washington Peluso Albino de Souza in 1990) and the Library building, inaugurated in 1998 by the Dean Aloizio Gonzaga Araujo de Andrade.

Inside the Library building, it was built, in original size and design, the first façade of the Free School of Law.

In December 2007, the Congregation of the School approved its transfer to UFMG's Pampulha Campus, buildings are to be constructed in coming years.

The School's founder and first director, Brazil's former president Afonso Pena, was succeeded by Antonio Gonçalves Chaves, Francisco Mendes Pimentel, Edmundo Pereira Lins, Arthur Ribeiro de Oliveira, Francisco Brant, Lincoln Prates, Antonio Martins Villas-Boas, Jose Geinaert of Valle Ferreira, Alberto Deodato Maia Barreto, Lourival Vilela Viana, Wilson da Silva Melo, Messiah Pereira Donato, José Alfredo de Oliveira Baracho, Washington Peluso Albino de Souza, Gonzaga Aloizio Araujo de Andrade, Ariosvaldo de Campos Pires, Aloizio Gonzaga de Andrade Araújo, Joaquim Carlos Salgado, Amanda Flavio Oliveira and Fernando Gonzaga Jayme.

In honor of its founder, the UFMG School of Law is still affectionately called the Vetusta Casa de Afonso Pena (Ancient House of Afonso Pena), by its students and academic community.

In 1908 it was founded Centro Acadêmico Afonso Pena or Afonso Pena Academic Center, the CAAP, one of the oldest and most traditional of Minas Gerais and Brazil.

Notable alumni includes ex-presidents Arthur Bernardes, Tancredo Neves, and governor Milton Campos.

Organization

There are four departments in the School:

 Civil Procedure and Commercial Law (DIC)
 Law and Criminal Procedure (DIN)
 Public Law (DIP)
 Labor Law and Jurisprudence(DIT)

There is a proposal for discussion at the School for departmental reform, in which the DAJ (Legal Clinics) would be transformed into a Department of Applied Law and Procedure.

References

External links
 Page of the UFMG School of Law
 Page of the Postgraduate Program of the UFMG School of Law

Minas Gerais
Educational institutions established in 1892
Federal University of Minas Gerais
1892 establishments in Brazil